The list of presidents of the Canadian Geophysical Union is a list of all the past and present presidents of the Canadian Geophysical Union.

 1974-1975 John Tuzo Wilson
 1975-1977 Denis Ian Gough
 1977-1979 Dave Strangway
 1979-1981 Don Russell
 1981-1983 Michael John Keen
 1983-1985 Zoltan Hajnal
 1985-1987 David J. Dunlop
 1987-1989 Petr Vanicek
 1989-1991 Douglas Edwin Smylie
 1991-1993 Richard Peltier
 1993-1995 Garry Clarke
 1995-1997 Roy Hyndman
 1997-1999 Larry Mayer
 1999-2001 Terry Prowse
 2001-2003 David Eaton
 2003-2005 Philip Marsh
 2005-2007 Gary Jarvis
 2007-2009 John Pomeroy
 2009-2011 Spiros Pagiatakis
 2011-2013 Gail Atkinson
 2013-2015 Brian Branfireun
 2015-2017 Claire Samson
 2017-2019 Richard Petrone
 2019-2021 Carl Mitchell
 2021-2023 Julian Lowman

References

External links
 Canadian Geophysical Union - CGU Presidents
 

Presidents of the Canadian Geophysical Union, List of
Canadian Geophysical Union
Canadian Geophysical Union